Celebrity Blackjack is an American television show where celebrities played tournament style blackjack for charity. The show, which ran on Game Show Network, was hosted by Matt Vasgersian (and Alex Borstein in the first season). Dave Stann was the dealer. Season 1 aired weekly from July 5, 2004, through August 9, 2004. Season 2 premiered October 12, 2004, and ran weekly through January 11, 2005.

Overview

Season 1
Five celebrities started each tournament with $100,000 in tournament chips and played 21 hands of blackjack. Minimum bets were $1,000 and maximum bets were $25,000 for the first ten hands. For hand 11-20, the minimum bet was $5,000 and there was no maximum bet. Double down for less is permitted. All bets throughout the tournament MUST be in $1,000 increments. A player cannot bet the remaining $500 which it would count as an all-in bet when the minimum bet is $5,000. However, a player may use the remaining $500 for the insurance. Insurance pays 2 to 1. Blackjack pays 3 to 2. The bets for the 21st and final hand were secret, with each player writing the bet out prior to the hand being played.

The deck included four jokers into the six decks they play with. Whatever a player is dealt with a joker card as one of the first 2 cards, a player will have a choice to replace any card on the table still in play once a player has received their first two cards (meaning, once a hand is stood on, it's no longer in-play). A player can also take the dealer's up card, if they wish.

Final table results

Caroline Rhea was the champion of Season 1, she won the title and $100,000 USD for her charities. 
1 Billy Baldwin substituted for his wife, Chynna Phillips, who won her preliminary table.

Season 2
The play for the second season of Celebrity Blackjack was the same, with the following exceptions:
 There were four celebrities per table instead of five.
 The deck included six jokers instead of four into the six decks they play with when there's only four celebrities. Whatever a player is dealt with a joker card as one of the first 2 cards, a player will have a choice to replace any card on the table still in play once a player has received their first two cards (meaning, once a hand is stood on, it's no longer in-play). A player can also take the dealer's up card, if they wish.
 The tournament featured ten preliminary rounds, two semi-final rounds, and a final table. Each preliminary table had four celebrities and each semi-final table had five players that won their preliminary round. The top two finishers from each of the two five-person semis round will move on to the Final table for a chance at winning an additional $200,000 for their charity.
 The winner of the preliminary round will receive $25,000 for their charity and move on to the semis round. For the Semis Round, the top two finishers (meaning first place will win an additional $75,000 and second place will win an additional $50,000) will move on to the Final table. For the final table, first place will win an additional $200,000, second place will win additional $50,000, and the last two ... they still have at least $50,000 to give from the preliminaries and the semis.
 The five card charlie was in effect. If a player has five cards without going over 21, he or she would automatically won the hand.

Final table results

Jason Alexander was the champion of Season 2, he won the title and $300,000 USD for his charity.

1 Jeff Probst filled in for Shannon Elizabeth, who won her preliminary table.

External links
 GSN homepage
 Celebrity Blackjack on Blackjack Hero

Television shows about blackjack
Game Show Network original programming
2004 American television series debuts
2005 American television series endings